This article lists the individuals who have won at least four gold medals at the Olympic Games or at least three gold medals in individual events.

List of most Olympic gold medals over career
This is a partial list of multiple Olympic gold medalists, listing people who have won four or more Olympic gold medals. Medals won in the 1906 Intercalated Games are not included. (If they were, Ray Ewry would be second on the list with 10 gold). It includes top-three placings in 1896 and 1900, before medals were awarded for top-three placings. The Olympics listed for each athlete only include games in which they won medals. See the particular article on the athlete for more details on when and for what nation an athlete competed. More medals are available in some events than others, and the number of events in which medals are available overall has changed over time. 

Names in Bold denote people that have competed in the most recent Olympics, namely 2022 Beijing Winter Olympics and 2020 Tokyo Summer Olympics.

Timeline
This is a progressive list of Olympians that have held the record for most titles won. It includes titles won in 1896 and 1900, before gold medals were awarded for first place. All record-holders have competed at Summer Games rather than Winter Games.

List of most career gold medals in individual events
This list currently includes all Olympians with three or more gold medals won as individuals (not as part of a team of two or more).

See also
List of multiple Olympic gold medalists at a single Games
List of multiple Olympic gold medalists in one event
List of multiple Olympic medalists
List of multiple Olympic medalists at a single Games
List of multiple Olympic medalists in one event
List of multiple Paralympic gold medalists
All-time Olympic Games medal table

References

 
 
 See also references in the articles on each athlete.